Maklouf is a surname and a derivative of Makhlouf. Notable people with the surname include:

Mahmoud Maklouf or Mahmoud Makhlof Shafter (born 1975), Egyptian-Libyan footballer 
Raphael Maklouf (born 1937), British Jewish sculptor

See also
Makhlouf